Lara J. Cushing is an assistant professor of environmental health sciences and holds the Jonathan and Karin Fielding Presidential Chair in Health Equity at the Fielding School of Public Health of the University of California, Los Angeles (UCLA).

Cushing studies exposures to environmental hazards and their relationship to social inequalities involving race and class. She also studies effects on pregnant women and infants.  She addresses the health consequences of living near greenspace, urban heat islands, hazardous materials sites, oil and gas drilling sites and exposure to dangerous chemicals in the air and water.  She examines the disparate impacts of global climate change, sea level rise and other issues involving environmental justice.

Career
Cushing has a  B.S. in molecular environmental biology, an M.P.H. in epidemiology (2011), and a PhD in energy & resources (2015) from the University of California, Berkeley.

From 2016-2020 Cushing was an assistant professor in the Department of Health Education at San Francisco State University. In addition she was a visiting scholar in the Department of Environmental Science, Policy and Management at the  University of California, Los Angeles.

As of October 2021, she became an assistant professor of environmental health sciences and the Jonathan and Karin Fielding Presidential Chair in Health Equity at the UCLA Fielding School of Public Health.

Research
Cushing received an EPA STAR Graduate Fellowship (2012–2015) in support of her Ph.D. work, to examine health impacts of climate change and their relationship to race, ethnicity and class in Texas, from an environmental justice perspective.

In addition she was a 2014 Environmental Fellow of the Robert & Patricia Switzer Foundation, 
and a 2018 JPB Environmental Health Fellow of the Harvard T.H. Chan School of Public Health.

Cushing was a contributing author to the IPCC Fourth Assessment Report (2007) and  IPCC Fifth Assessment Report (2014) of the United Nations Intergovernmental Panel on Climate Change (IPCC).

She helped to develop a statewide environmental justice screening tool for use in California:  the California Communities Environmental Health Screening Tool or CalEnviroScreen proposed as part of California Senate Bill 535 (2012).

In 2018, Cushing and others published the results of studying California’s cap-and-trade program. Evidence from the carbon-trading program between 2011 and 2015  supported concerns that companies would keep emitting. Half of the facilities involved actually increased in-state emissions during the period observed.  Facilities in disadvantaged neighborhoods were more likely to increase emissions.

In 2020, Cushing and Jill E. Johnston reported on the potential health impacts on pregnant women of flaring in the Eagle Ford Shale of Texas. Their results showed that women who lived closer to the flares  had a 30-50% higher risk of premature birth and lower birth weight than women who did not live near oil and gas wells. In addition, self-identified Latina or Hispanic women were exposed to more flaring and were at higher risk of preterm birth.

Selected publications

Notes

References

Living people
University of California, Los Angeles faculty
University of California, Berkeley alumni
American epidemiologists
Public health researchers
Year of birth missing (living people)